Telenești is a district in central Moldova, with the administrative center at Telenești.

History
The oldest recorded settlements of the district are: Banești, Peciste and Telenești, mentioned in 1437. At the time, the landowners had the right to sell their estate, in parts or entirely. In the 16th and 17th centuries, the region's economy developed (trade, agriculture, winery), resulting in a significant increase in population. In 1812, after the Treaty of Bucharest, Bessarabia was occupied by the Russian Empire, and an intense process of russification of the native population followed. In 1918, as a result of the fall of the Russian Empire, Bessarabia was united with Romania, and the Romanian government enacted a land reform. The  capital had a courthouse and a post office with telegraph and telephone. The Romanian land reform (as opposed to the Bolshevik one) made the peasants owners of a plot of land, and the previous owners were compensated. After the Molotov-Ribbentrop Treaty, Bessarabia was occupied by the Soviet Union. In 1991, the district became a part of independent Moldova, and in 1999 it was dissolved, and its territory was included in Orhei County, until 2003, when it was reestablished as an administrative unit of Moldova.

Geography
Telenești district is located in central part of the Republic of Moldova. Does neighborhood in north Soldanesti and Florești districts, in northeast Rezina District, in southeast Orhei District, Calarași and Ungheni districts in south and northwest Singerei District. The landscape is broken by an intense process of sliding. In northwestern of district stretching branches of Plateau of Nistru and the south Central Moldavian Plateau. District basement contains deposits of limestone, stone in places Căzănești, Ordășei, Pistruieni and sand for construction to Verejeni, Telenești.

Climate
District climate is temperate continental. July average temperature is +28 °C, for January -4 °C. Annual precipitation 500–600 mm. Average wind speed is 2–5 m/s.

Fauna
Rich and varied fauna is represented by red deer, wild boar, foxes, wolves, badgers, rabbits. Of birds there are: jays, doves, starlings, storks, gulls, herons, hawks, owls and others.

Flora
Flora features Moldovian codri of trees: oak, beech, lime, ash, maple, acacia, nuts and others. Plants: knotweed, clover, wormwood, bellflower and others.

Rivers
District is located in the Nistru river basin. The main river crossing district is Raut (286 km), with its tributaries Ciuluicul Mare and Ciuluc de Mijloc. Most lakes are artificial. The largest lake is Lake Verejeni built on Ciuluicul Mare.

Administrative subdivisions
Localities: 54
Administrative center: Telenești
Cities: Telenești
Villages: 23
Commons: 30

Demographics

1 January 2012 the district population was 73,900 of which 11.0% urban and 89.0% rural population.

Births (2010): 858 (11.5 per 1000)
Deaths (2010): 998 (13.4 per 1000)
Growth Rate (2010): -140 (-1.9 per 1000)

Ethnic groups 

Footnote: * There is an ongoing controversy regarding the ethnic identification of Moldovans and Romanians.

Religion 
Christians - 99.0%
Orthodox Christians - 98.0%
Protestant - 1.0%
Baptists - 0.4%
Seventh-day Adventists - 0.4%
Evangelicals - 0.2%
Other 0.8%
No Religion 0.2%

Economy
The total number of businesses that makes up 25,604 active agents (of which 24 151 farms). 62 970 ha agricultural land (74.1%). Perennial plantations occupy 5800 ha (6.8%), including 2.900 ha of vineyards (3.4%); orchards 2.040 ha (2.4%). Main crops: cereals (wheat, oats), maize, sunflower, canola, grape, in orchards: apple, peach, plum and more.

Education
For the 2010-2011 school year, the district education network consists of units: 34 preschools are employed - 2530 children, 25 secondary schools and secondary schools where they study - 8121 students, seven high schools - 808 pupils, a school hospitalized children with disabilities (Telenești) - 119 children a school - boarding school for orphans (Căzăneşti) with - 85 children and a vocational school with 163 students.

Politics
A large majority of district support right-wing parties. PCRM has never achieved victory in the district, in the last three elections is in a constant fall. AEI has a good support in the district.

During the last three elections AEI had an increase of 72.0%

Elections

|-
!style="background-color:#E9E9E9" align=center colspan="2" valign=center|Parties and coalitions
!style="background-color:#E9E9E9" align=right|Votes
!style="background-color:#E9E9E9" align=right|%
!style="background-color:#E9E9E9" align=right|+/−
|-
| 
|align=left|Liberal Democratic Party of Moldova
|align="right"|15,894
|align="right"|49.13
|align="right"|+23.04
|-
| 
|align=left|Party of Communists of the Republic of Moldova
|align="right"|7,248
|align="right"|22.41
|align="right"|−9.53
|-
| 
|align=left|Democratic Party of Moldova
|align="right"|4,684
|align="right"|14,48
|align="right"|+1.84
|-
| 
|align=left|Liberal Party
|align="right"|2,514
|align="right"|7.77
|align="right"|−4.01
|-
|bgcolor=#0033cc|
|align=left|European Action Movement
|align="right"|610
|align="right"|1.89
|align="right"|+1.89
|-
|bgcolor="grey"|
|align=left|Other Party
|align="right"|1,407
|align="right"|4.32
|align="right"|+1.99
|-
|align=left style="background-color:#E9E9E9" colspan="2"|Total (turnout 61.78%)
|width="30" align="right" style="background-color:#E9E9E9"|32,588
|width="30" align="right" style="background-color:#E9E9E9"|100.00
|width="30" align="right" style="background-color:#E9E9E9"|

Culture
Cultural sector of the district is represented by the activity: 44 cultural centers, 47 libraries, school district music with branches in the district, a school of fine arts - with 150 children, 4 museums.

Health
Working in district: District hospital, centers of family doctors, a unit of health centers - 5 units, 33 offices of family doctors, pharmacies (hospital) - 1 unit and branches - 31 units, pharmacies and private extra - 10 units.

Personalities

 Andrei Năstase

References

External links
 The official site of the district
 Results of parliamentary elections 2005

 
Districts of Moldova